Ayatollah Mirza Hashem Amoli Larijani (26 February 189925 February 1993) was an Iranian Shia Marja' and scholar of jurisprudence.

Biography 
Hashem Amoli Larijani was born on 26 February 1899 in the Pardameh village of Larijan, Mazandaran province. He studied Islamic sciences in Amol, Tehran, and Qom. In Tehran, he studied in Sepahsalar school which was managed by Hassan Modarres. In 1926, he went to Qom and stayed for six years. Mirza Hashem Amoli Larijani achieved his Ijtihadlike a PhD in university educational degree from Abdul-Karim Ha'eri Yazdi and Muhammad Hujjat Kuh-Kamari. After that Amoli migrated to Najaf seminary and stayed there for thirty years. He moved back to Qom around 1963.

Amoli was the father of one daughter (Fazeleh Larijani) and five sons (Mohammad Javad Larijani, Fazel Larijani, Ali Larijani, Sadegh Larijani and Bagher Larijani), who have held positions in the government of Islamic Republic of Iran.

Teachers 
 Abdul-Karim Ha'eri Yazdi
 Muhammad Hujjat Kuh-Kamari
 Mohammad Ali Shah Abadi
 Abul Hassan Sha'rani
 Agha Mirza Taher Tonekaboni
 Mohammad Ali Lavasani
 Mirza Yadollah Nazarpak
 Seyyed Mohammad Tonekaboni
 Mirza Mohammad Reza Faqihe Larijani
 Agha Zia-Addin Araghi
 Muhammad Hosein Na'ini
 Abu al-Hasan Isfahani

Students 
Amoli's famous students include:
 Mostafa Mohaghegh Damad
 Mohammad Mohammadi Gilani
 Mohammad Mofatteh
 Jawad Tabrizi
 Naser Makarem Shirazi
 Abdollah Javadi-Amoli
 Mohammad Reza Nekoonam,
 Mohammad-Hadi Marefat
 Mohammad Yazdi.

Death 
Mirza Hashem Amoli Larijani died on 25 February 1993.

Ayatollah Amoli Larijani University 
In 1999, Ayatollah Amoli Larijani University was founded and named after the death of Mirza Hashem Amoli in the Amol. The land of the university was donated by Hashem Amoli Larijani when he was alive and declared this land for promoting knowledge.

See also 

 Lists of Maraji

References

External links 
 Photo of Mirza Hashem Amoli Larijani
 Lost Gem, biography of Mirza Hashem Amoli Larijani

Iranian scholars
20th-century Muslim theologians
1899 births
1993 deaths
People from Amol
Shia Islamists
Iranian ayatollahs
20th-century Iranian philosophers